Harpurostreptus krausi, is a species of round-backed millipede in the family Harpagophoridae. It is native to Uttaranchal area of India and in Sri Lanka.

References

Spirostreptida
Endemic fauna of Sri Lanka
Millipedes of Asia
Animals described in 1962